Vertigo arctica is a species of minute air-breathing land snail, a terrestrial pulmonate gastropod mollusk in the family Vertiginidae, the whorl snails.

Distribution 
This species occurs in:
 Poland - critically endangered

Shell description 
Shell is dextral, rimate, ovate, thin, smoothish, somewhat glossy, pellucid, brownish-tawny. The shell has 5 to 5 ½ whorls, convex, the last nearly two-fifths the altitude, rounded at base, anteriorly having a somewhat swollen crest.

Aperture is slightly oblique, semiovate or piriform, obstructed by 3 teeth: in the middle of the parietal wall, on the columella, and a smaller one in the palate (frequently wanting). Peristome is spreading, slightly labiate, the margins joined by a callus, the right margin very strongly curved above, columellar margin is somewhat dilated, spreading.

The width of the adult shell is about 2.5 mm, the height about 1.5 mm.

References 
This article incorporates public domain text from reference.

 Wallenberg, C. von (1858). Beschreibung einer neuen Pupa. Malakozoologische Blätter , 5: 32

External links
 Gredler, V. M. (1890). Eine neue Tiroler Pupa. Nachrichtsblatt der deutschen malakozoologischen Gesellschaft. 22: 41-42. Frankfurt am Main.

arctica
Gastropods described in 1858